Jonathan B. Tomines, also known as The Toe Bro, is a Canadian chiropodist. Tomines works at Mississauga Foot Clinic, located in Mississauga, Ontario. He also has his own television documentary series, The Toe Bro, which began airing in 2019.

Education and practice 
Tomines attended the University of Waterloo, where he received his undergraduate degree in Bio Medical Science. He then went on to receive his Graduate Advanced Diploma of Health Sciences specializing in Chiropody at the Michener Institute for Applied Health Sciences.

As a boy, Tomines often accompanied his father, also a chiropodist, to the office, sometimes providing basic help to the patients. Tomines now works in the same office in which his father worked for thirty years. His father is from the Philippines and his mother is from Germany.

Tomines cites the videos of dermatologist Sandra Lee as part of the inspiration for his YouTube videos and brand.

References

External links 
 
 

Year of birth missing (living people)
Podiatrists
University of Waterloo alumni
Canadian YouTubers
YouTube channels launched in 2017
People from Mississauga
Educational and science YouTubers
Celebrity doctors
Living people
Canadian people of Filipino descent
Canadian people of German descent